Columnea glabra is a species of plant that may be found growing in montane cloud forest habitats in Central and South America. It commonly grows as an epiphyte.

References 

glabra
Epiphytes